Stanhopea avicula is a species of orchid endemic to Panama.

References

External links 

avicula
Endemic flora of Panama
Orchids of Panama